WHTG may refer to:

 WHTG (AM), a radio station (1410 AM) licensed to Eatontown, New Jersey, United States
 WKMK, a radio station (106.3 FM) licensed to Eatontown, New Jersey, United States formerly known as WHTG-FM 1961 to 2010
 WBBO, a radio station (98.5 FM) licensed to Ocean Acres, New Jersey, United States formerly known as WHTG-FM briefly From September 15, 2010 to December 8, 2010